Aleksandrovka is a village in Chüy Region of Kyrgyzstan. It is part of the Moskva District. The village was established in 1882.  Its population was 14,577 in 2021. The village is located at Bishkek - Osh Road (European route E010) in Chüy Valley.

Population

References

Populated places in Chüy Region